Chlorophorus trifasciatus is a species of longhorn beetle. It can be found on oak trees near the Mediterranean Basin.

References

Clytini
Beetles of Europe
Beetles described in 1781